Provincial Road 327 (PR 327) is a provincial road in the Canadian province of Manitoba.  It runs from Highway 60 to the town of Easterville in the indian reserve Chemawawin 2.

References

327